James F. Jacks II (born January 21, 1970) is an American politician of the Democratic Party. He is a former member of the Washington House of Representatives, representing the 49th Legislative District.

References

Democratic Party members of the Washington House of Representatives
Living people
1970 births
Oregon State University alumni